Building Bridges is a program located in Thompson Falls, Montana, designed to help adolescent males with addiction and behavior issues. It was created in 1996 to house male teenagers, aged 14 to 18, in a natural and highly structured environment. Building Bridges is a private, small, long-term residential program, of a self-reported average duration of 12–18 months. It is a member of the National Association of Therapeutic Schools and Programs (NATSAP).

See also
 Adventure therapy
 Wilderness therapy

References

External links
 Official website

Further reading
 Maia Szalavitz (2006), Help at Any Cost, Riverhead. . A former senior fellow of the Statistical Assessment Service at George Mason University offers a thoroughly researched critique of the troubled-teen industry, which includes an ethical guide for parents with troubled teenagers.

Behavior modification
Outdoor education organizations
Organizations based in Montana
Thompson Falls, Montana